Township and Village Enterprises (TVEs) are market-oriented public enterprises under the purview of local governments based in townships and villages in China.

History
The State Council of the People's Republic of China first officially used the term "TVE" in March, 1984.
Previously "Commune and Brigade Enterprises" dating from the Great Leap Forward of 1958 to 1961 had served the rural areas. During that time TVEs had a limited role and were restricted to the production of iron, steel, cement, chemical fertilizer, hydroelectric power, and farm tools.

Most TVEs emerged during the Reform period in the 1980s (Huang, 2008). Though there were 12 million TVEs by 1985, there were only 1.5 million in 1978, at the start of the Reform period. As Huang summarizes: "Clearly, the vast majority of TVEs had nothing to do with the Great Leap Forward."

Government reform
The reforms of 1978 changed TVEs, which became the most vibrant part of the Chinese economy as they experienced significant expansion in the 1980s and early 1990s. TVE employment grew from 28 million in 1978 to a peak of 135 million in 1996.  Likewise, production of TVEs increased to 1.8 trillion yuan in 1992 from 49 billion yuan in 1978. More than half of TVE production in the 1980s occurred in Guangdong, Fujian, Zhejiang, Jiangsu, and Shandong provinces, all of which border the Pacific Ocean. In Jiangsu and Shandong TVEs employed some 30 percent of the rural workforce.

Notable characteristics
TVEs referred to the location of the enterprises, as opposed to the ownership structure. That is, TVE never referred to only companies owned by township and villages; rather, TVE refers to companies located in townships and villages. Huang (2008) quotes a Chinese Ministry of Agriculture document from 1984 in support of this: TVEs include enterprises sponsored by townships and villages, the alliance enterprises [private stock companies] formed by peasants, other alliance enterprises, and individual enterprises." 
Some collective TVEs were notable for their unique ownership and corporate governance setup.

Many of these firms were “collectively owned” in the sense that theoretical ownership rested with the collectives, either as a legacy of earlier sponsorship, or because township and village governments took the lead in establishing new TVEs after the breakup of the agricultural collectives. Ultimate “ownership rights” stayed with the collective, while “use rights” were delegated to managers in collective TVEs. The complexity of this arrangement led to the labeling of collective (township and village) TVE property rights as “fuzzy.” This lack of a true system of property rights collapsed in a short amount of time, as townships and villages expropriated the use rights using their ownership rights.

TVEs were very flexible in terms of organizational and ownership structure. While some were run by local governments, others were more genuinely independent in nature. Wong has shown that through the 1980s most of the supposedly collective TVEs operated as private enterprises in practice.  In this sense, the use of the term collective masked the privatization of rural enterprise at a time when it was ideologically subversive to some.

TVEs thrived from 1978 to 1989, and were largely dismantled between 1989 and 1996. Scholars have given a number of reasons for their success.  The political institutional environment favored these “public” enterprises during the early years of reform, since private businesses faced severe restrictions and discrimination in terms of resources and regulations. Also, the fiscal decentralization of the early 1980s gave greater decision-making power to local governments and linked fiscal revenue to the career potential of local officials, creating strong incentives for them to promote these enterprises.  The TVEs moved in to take advantage of the gaps left in the market by the State-Owned Enterprises to produce colorful elastic bands, ID card holders, etc. The TVEs benefited from first mover advantage as there was no competition in the early stages from private firms due to restrictions on the markets. The pent-up demand in China for a host of products provided ample profit-making opportunities for enterprises operating at this early juncture. Moreover, TVEs were helped by massive loans from the state banking system.

The TVE sector experienced dramatic changes in 1995-1996 (Huang, 2008). Official hostility toward Chinese entrepreneurship during the period of Jiang Zemin's administration caused many to go out of business, with some estimates suggesting that about 30 percent have gone bankrupt.  In addition, there has been a massive trend toward privatization.  After the mid-1990s, TVEs were forced to restructure substantially. With increased market integration and competition, official discrimination against TVEs, and official preference for foreign-owned enterprises, TVEs lost their competitive position.

Further, the end of directional liberalism in China encouraged local officials to expropriate the TVEs. As competition intensified and credit became harder to obtain, the collectively owned TVE sector grew in comparison to the privately owned TVEs. Rural industries today are more tied to their local government and community and have taken on new forms and roles (Huang, 2008). One of the most striking developments has been the rise of “industrial clusters” of small firms both competing with one another and cooperating to form a relatively complete industrial chain. Industrial clusters have also emerged in places such as Brazil and Italy.

See also
 Province (China) (for a discussion of townships and villages).
 Production team (China)
 Village-owned enterprise

References

External links
First book on rural enterprises published - Xinhuanet. 6 Dec. 2005.
State-Owned versus Township and Village Enterprises in China

Economic history of the People's Republic of China